Valérie Debord (born 29 November 1971) was a member of the National Assembly of France.  She is of Italian origin and represented the Meurthe-et-Moselle department,  and was a member of the Union for a Popular Movement. She lost her seat on 17 June 2012 to Socialist Hervé Féron, by 54.15% to 45.85%.

References

1971 births
Living people
People from Chaumont, Haute-Marne
Politicians from Grand Est
French people of Italian descent
The Republicans (France) politicians
Women members of the National Assembly (France)
Deputies of the 13th National Assembly of the French Fifth Republic
21st-century French women politicians
Regional councillors of Grand Est
Chevaliers of the Légion d'honneur